Curranville is an unincorporated community in Crawford County, Kansas, United States.

History
A post office was opened in Curranville in 1905, and remained in operation until it was discontinued in 1915.

Curranville was incorporated in 1906.

References

Further reading

External links
 Crawford County maps: Current, Historic, KDOT

Unincorporated communities in Crawford County, Kansas
Unincorporated communities in Kansas